Chicago Open Air was an annual concert held in Bridgeview, Illinois, United States that features several rock and metal acts. Beginning in 2016, the festival got a lot of recognition as it was Rammstein's only US performance that year. It is held at Toyota Park. Korn debuted the new single "Rotting in Vain" on July 16, 2016 at Chicago Open Air.

The first concert was held from July 14 to July 17, 2016. The 2018 festival was cancelled, but the festival returned in 2019. It was announced via email in late 2019 that the festival was on hiatus for 2020.

Chicago Open Air 2016

Pre-Party (Thursday, July 14)
Otep
Shaman's Harvest
Islander
Through Fire

Day one (Friday, July 15)

Main Stage:
Rammstein
Chevelle
Ministry
Of Mice & Men
In This Moment
Hollywood Undead
Trivium

Second Stage:
Meshuggah
The Devil Wears Prada
Hatebreed
Periphery
Drowning Pool
Butcher Babies
Through Fire

Day two (Saturday, July 16)

Main Stage:
Disturbed
Korn
Breaking Benjamin
Alter Bridge
Pop Evil
Helmet
Nothing More
Saint Asonia

Second Stage:
Gojira
Deafheaven
Carcass
Miss May I
Beartooth
Silver Snakes
City of the Weak

Day three (Sunday, July 17)

Main Stage:
Slipknot
Five Finger Death Punch
Marilyn Manson
Bullet for My Valentine
Asking Alexandria (canceled)
All That Remains
Jim Breuer & The Loud & Rowdy

Second Stage:
Killswitch Engage
Babymetal
Corrosion of Conformity
Letlive
We Came as Romans
Upon a Burning Body
Gemini Syndrome

Chicago Open Air 2017

Day one (Friday, July 14)
Kiss
Rob Zombie
Megadeth
Anthrax
Meshuggah
The Dillinger Escape Plan
Falling in Reverse
Vimic
Suicide Silence
Whitechapel
Crobot
Code Orange
Hell or Highwater
Failure Anthem

Day two (Saturday, July 15)
Korn
Godsmack
Seether
Clutch
Steel Panther
Body Count
Avatar
Mushroomhead
Metal Church
Pig Destroyer
DragonForce
Cane Hill
Night Verses
Black Map

Day three (Sunday, July 16)
Ozzy Osbourne
Slayer
Stone Sour
Lamb of God
Amon Amarth
Behemoth
Hellyeah
Demon Hunter
DevilDriver
Kyng
Norma Jean
Whores
Ded

Chicago Open Air 2019

Day one (Saturday, May 18)
System of a Down
Ghost
Meshuggah
Beartooth
Code Orange
Knocked Loose
Vein
Note: Vein, Knocked Loose, and Code Orange did not play due to severe weather.

Day two (Sunday, May 19)
Tool
The Cult
Gojira
In This Moment
Fever 333
The Black Dahlia Murder
Alien Weaponry

References

2016 establishments in Illinois
Concerts in the United States
Tourist attractions in Cook County, Illinois
Heavy metal festivals in the United States